Jordan Ulery (born October 19, 1949) is an American politician in the state of New Hampshire. He is a member of the New Hampshire House of Representatives, sitting as a Republican from the Hillsborough 37 district, having been first elected in 2004.

References

Living people
1949 births
People from Elkhart, Indiana
People from Hudson, New Hampshire
Saint Anselm College alumni
Republican Party members of the New Hampshire House of Representatives
21st-century American politicians